Kisarawe is one of the six districts of the Pwani Region of Tanzania. It is bordered to the East by Dar es Salaam Region, to the north by the Kibaha District, to the east by the Mkuranga District, to the south by the Rufiji District and to the west by the Morogoro Region. The district is the historical homeland of the Ndengereko and Zaramo people. 

According to the 2002 Tanzania National Census, the population of the Kisarawe District was 95,614.

Wards
The Kisarawe District is administratively divided into 15 wards:
 Cholesamvula
 Kibuta
 Kiluvya
 Kisarawe
 Kuruhi
 Mafinzi
 Maneromango
 Marui
 Marumbo
 Masaki
 Msanga
 Msimbu
 Mzenga
 Vihingo
 Vikumbulu

Sources

Districts of Pwani Region